Mykola Tsehelskyi (Ukrainian: Мико́ла Цеге́льський, alternative English spelling: Nicholas), December 17, 1896- May 25, 1951, was a Ukrainian Greek Catholic priest.  The Church considers him a martyr due to his refusal to convert under duress.

Tsehelskyi was born on December 17, 1896, in the village of Strusiv, Ternopil Region in what has then Austria-Hungary. In 1923, he graduated from the Lviv University theology faculty. On April 5, 1925, Sheptyskyi ordained Tsehelskyi to the priesthood.  He was assigned to a parish.

At the end of World War II, the Soviet authorities started pressuring Tsehelskyi  to convert to the Russian Orthodox Church, threatening to beat him.  He refused to convert. On October 28, 1946, Tsehelskyi was arrested and on January 27, 1947, was sent to prison in the Moldova SSR.   After Tsehelskyi's imprisonment, his family was exiled to Chita in Russia.

While in prison, Tsehelskyi wrote to his wife, saying  "My dearest wife, the feast of the Dormition was our 25th wedding anniversary. I recall fondly our family life together, and every day in my dreams I am with you and the children, and this makes me happy... I  happy give a fatherly kiss to all their foreheads and I hope to live honestly, behaving blamelessly, keeping far from everything that is foul. I pray for this most of all. "

On May 25, 1951, Tsehelskyi died in prison in Moldova and was buried in the camp cemetery.

References

Further reading 

 Лідія Купчик. Життєносні стовпи Церкви. Львів. — Місіонер — 2010.
 Лідія Купчик (редактор). Родом зі Струсова. Розповіді про Цегельських. Львів — 2002. Завантажити книгу
 Б. Головин, В. Чубатий. Цегельський Микола-Сава-Йосафат Теодорович // Тернопільський енциклопедичний словник : у 4 т. / редкол.: Г. Яворський та ін. — Тернопіль : Видавничо-поліграфічний комбінат «Збруч», 2008. — Т. 3 : П — Я. — 708 с. — . — С. 568–569.

People from the Kingdom of Galicia and Lodomeria
Ukrainian Austro-Hungarians
Ukrainian Greek Catholic Church
Catholic martyrs
1896 births
1951 deaths